Soccer Bowl 2017 is the North American Soccer League's postseason championship match of the 2017 season which determined the NASL Champion.

Background 

Miami FC and San Francisco Deltas finished 1st and 2nd respectively in both the Spring and Fall seasons by wide margins. Miami FC's regular season record (21 wins, 6 draws, 5 losses, 69 points) was the best in modern NASL history. The New York Cosmos clinched the last playoff spot on the last day of the regular season. North Carolina FC also earned a spot in The Championship. Due to Hurricane Maria, Puerto Rico FC was forced to abandon Juan Ramón Loubriel Stadium for their last five home games, which were moved to other teams venues or to neutral sites. The rescheduled games raised money for hurricane relief.

Path to the final

Semi-final #1

Miami FC and New York Cosmos met four times during the regular season. They each won a game at the other's home stadium in the Spring season. The Cosmos won in New York and tied Miami in Miami during the Fall season.

Semi-final #2

San Francisco Deltas and North Carolina FC met four times during the regular season. The Deltas won both their matches in the Spring season. The teams played to 1–1 ties in both Fall season games.

Match

Details

2017 NASL Champions: San Francisco Deltas

Statistics

References 

2017
2017 North American Soccer League season